Jamling Tenzing Norgay (born 23 April 1965) is a Nepalese Indian mountaineer.

Biography 
Norgay is the son of Nepali mountaineer and guide Tenzing Norgay (who first climbed Mount Everest in 1953 with Sir Edmund Hillary) and Daku, his third wife. Jamling Tenzing Norgay himself later followed in his father's footsteps and climbed Mount Everest in 1996 with a team led by David Breashears that also included mountaineer Ed Viesturs and Araceli Segarra, an experience documented in the 1998 IMAX film Everest. In 2002, he and Peter Hillary, the son of Edmund Hillary, were part of an expedition to climb Everest and commemorate the 50th anniversary of the first ascent.

Norgay went on to write Touching My Father's Soul, a book documenting his experiences on the summit attempt. The book was notable for the frankness with which it discussed the relationship between the often wealthy climbers and the Sherpas who obtain their incomes from assisting expeditions. Norgay's book was the first to discuss from the Sherpas' point of view of the disastrous May 1996 climbing season, in which twelve climbers died. It noted that little notice is taken when Sherpas die, but much attention is given when those lost are clients.

Norgay is an alumnus of Northland College.

Bibliography

References 

1965 births
Living people
Indian writers
Indian mountain climbers
Northland College (Wisconsin) alumni
Sherpa summiters of Mount Everest
St. Paul's School, Darjeeling alumni
Indian summiters of Mount Everest
People from Darjeeling
Indian Gorkhas
Sherpa people